Lara McAllen  is an English singer, songwriter and vocal producer.

Biography
McAllen is the singer for the dance-pop music project Angel City. She began dancing at the age of five, and briefly pursued a modelling career before becoming a backing dancer for the pop singer Shakira at age 19. She then began her career as a dance music vocalist with Angel City when she signed her first recording contract with Ministry of Sound at age 20. Her debut single Love Me Right was picked up by Radio 1 as a “Record of the week” and soon crossed over from dance floor hit to mainstream chart hit both in the UK and Europe.  Love Me Right topped the US Dance Chart as well as entering the Billboard chart. Before Angel City, Lara found dancefloor success with Stuart's 2001 house release "Free (Let It Be)", released through Incentive, an offshoot of Ministry of Sound.

While originally credited as a featured vocalist in Angel City, McAllen later joined the group (of producers) as lead singer and performed all the tracks on the debut album "Love Me Right". McAllen had further UK Top 10 records with Angel City before pursuing work both in vocal production and songwriting. As a partner of the production company responsible for the Angel City records, McAllen worked alongside producers such as Jason Nevins, Rob Davis (Kylie Minogue) and Armin Van Buuren. She has also presented for Sky TV Channels on programmes such as FYC as well as co-presenting on Capital Disney Radio and Liverpool’s Radio City.  McAllen has appeared on TV shows such as Never Mind the Buzzcocks, CD:UK, Des and Mel and performed her debut single Love Me Right on Top of the Pops.

Between 2008 and 2010, several collaborations featuring McAllen (both vocals and songwriting) featured on Clubland albums were released through All Around the World. Having claimed that she was happier away from the performance side, McAllen again performs lead vocals on Angel City's most recent single "How Do You Sleep", a dance cover of Jesse McCartney's single.

McAllen has appeared in various media shoots including OK!, Hello! and Marie Claire, as well as shoots for Loaded, Maxim and FHM.

Personal life
McAllen divorced her football agent husband in 2010, and met her new husband, IT business owner, Adam Bashford soon after. They started a new company together in property development and interior design. They married in 2017, during a Christian ceremony at their home in Italy.

Discography

Albums

Singles

References

External links
 Insanity Artists Agency Ltd.
 Fansite for Lara and Angel City
 Interview with McAllen

1983 births
Living people
People from Guildford
English people of Scottish descent
English women in electronic music
People educated at Sir William Perkins's School
21st-century English women singers
21st-century English singers